Woodthorpe is a surname. Notable people with the surname include: 

Colin Woodthorpe (born 1969), English footballer
Henry Woodthorpe Jr. (1780–1842), Town Clerk of London
Henry Woodthorpe Sr. (1755–1825), Town Clerk of London
Katherine Woodthorpe, Australian business executive
Peter Woodthorpe (1931–2004), English actor
Vincent Woodthorpe (c.1764–1822), English artist
Walter Woodthorpe (1860–1943), South African cricketer